Svante is the shortening for the Swedish male first name Svantepolk.
It originates from Slavic ancestors of first prominent Svantes in Sweden. The Slavic languages have the name which is rendered as Sviatopolk in Russian, Swiãtopôłk in Kashubian, Świętopełk in Polish and Svatopluk/Svätopluk in Czech and Slovakian. Also Svjatopluk and so forth in other renditions.

In the 13th century, Svantepolk of Viby (d 1310) settled in Sweden. He was a valued ancestor, well-remembered in his noble Swedish descendants' pedigrees and family lore, and the name Svante was given to many of his descendants.

 Svante Bosson (Sture), uncle of the regent Svante (see below)
 Svante, Regent of Sweden (1460–1512), leader of the Swedish government between 1504 and 1512
 Svante Sture, Count of Stegeholm (1517–67), his grandson
 Svante Arrhenius a Swedish chemist
 Svante Stenbock (1578–1632)
 Svante Bielke, Lord High Chancellor of Sweden 1602-1609
 Svante Larsson Sparre, Governor of Uppland 1649-1652
 Svante Banér (1584–1628)
 Svante Svantesson Banér (1624–74), Governor of Uppland 1652-54
 Svante Thunberg (born 1969), Swedish actor, manager, and producer

See also
Świętopełk: Polish version
Sviatopolk: Ukrainian, Russian, Bulgarian version
Zwentibold: German version
Svatopluk: Czech version 
Svätopluk: Slovak version

References

Swedish families
Swedish masculine given names
Slavic-language names